This is an incomplete list of trade magazines (or trade journals) which are notable.

Advertising
 Advertising Age
 Ad Week

Aerospace industry
 Aviation Week & Space Technology
 SpaceNews

Amusement industry 

 Amusement Today
 Funworld Magazine

Arts and cultural industries
 TradeArt

Computer industry
 see: List of computer magazines

Construction industry
 Cranes Today

Consumer electronics
 Popular Mechanics
 Twice

Electronics
 EDN
 EE Times
 Electronic News

Fashion industry
 Women's Wear Daily

Film industry
 American Cinematographer
 BackStage
 Boxoffice Magazine
 CinemaEditor
 Creative COW
 Film International
 Filmmaker
 fps magazine
 Film Comment
 Film Daily
 Film Quarterly
 Harrison's Reports
 The Hollywood Reporter
 indieWire
 MovieMaker
 Playback
 Variety

Financial services industry
 Citywire
 Financial Adviser
 Global Banking And Finance Review
 Investment Adviser
 Investment Week
 Money Management
 Money Marketing
 Professional Pensions

Food and drink
 Australian Dairy Foods
 Food Engineering
 Restaurant Magazine

Fresh produce
 Eurofruit

Gaming industry
 Coinslot
 Game Industry Report Magazine

Law
 Law Practice Magazine
 Legal Week

Media
 Campaign
 MediaWeek
 New Media Age
 Revolution

Manufacturing trades
 Advanced Manufacturing
 Pulp and Paper
 Surplus Record Machinery & Equipment Directory

Music industry
 Billboard
 CashBox Magazine
 Music Week
 Radio & Records

Packaging
 Packaging Digest
 Packaging Machinery Technology
 Packaging World

Publishing and book trade
 Booklist
 The Hard Copy Observer
 Library Journal
 Publishers Weekly
 School Library Journal

Retailing
 Private Label

Technical trades
 BioTechniques
 Genetic Engineering News
 Imaging Technology News

U.S. Politics
 Congressional Quarterly
 The Hill (newspaper)
 National Journal
 Roll Call

See also
 List of academic journals
 Reed Business Information, containing a partial list of business and trade magazines from this publisher